125 Greenwich Street (also known as 22 Thames Street) is a residential skyscraper under construction in the Financial District in Lower Manhattan, New York City, which opened in March 2023. The tower is two blocks south of One World Trade Center on the site of the former Western Electric building, and directly across from the site of the demolished Deutsche Bank Building. The building was designed by architect Rafael Viñoly, with interiors designed by British duo March & White.

History
The original building at this address was a 10-story telephone factory built in 1888–1889 for Western Electric and sold in the 1980s to the American Stock Exchange. It was demolished decades later by further property investors for the skyscraper. In September 2014, it was announced that the tower would stand , with 77 floors and 128 residential units. The foundation of the building was completed in June 2016.

Architecture
The tower has distinctly rounded corners with curved floor-to-ceiling glass. The building is nearly column-free, and two I-beam-shaped shear walls that run vertically through the slender tower support the floors of the building. The top three floors contain amenities including entertainment space, private dining rooms, a fitness center, lap pool, and a spa. The building will contain 273 apartments that will come in studios through three-bedroom variants.

References 

Buildings and structures under construction in the United States
Residential skyscrapers in Manhattan
Financial District, Manhattan
Proposed buildings and structures in New York City
Rafael Viñoly buildings
Residential condominiums in New York City
Pencil towers in New York City